Jhr. Reneke (René) de Marees van Swinderen (6 October 1860, in Groningen – 17 January 1955, in London) was a Dutch diplomat and politician. He married Elizabeth Lindsay Glover 21 December 1904 in Washington, D.C.

Career 
From September 9, 1887 to 1888 he was Attaché in the Cabinet of the Minister, Ministry of Foreign Affairs.
Until October 1889 he was Attaché in Berlin. 
From October 1889 to 1890 he was Attaché to Washington, D.C. 
From 1890 to April 1894 he was second class secretary of legation in Vienna. 
From April 9, 1894 to December 1899 he was first class secretary of legation to Saint Petersburg. 
From January 1900 to 1901 he was first class secretary of legation in Paris. 
From 1901 to 1903 he was minister at Bucharest. 
In 1904 he was minister at Belgrade. 
From February 18, 1904 to February 12, 1908 he was envoy extraordinary and minister plenipotentiary in Washington, D.C., also accredited in Mexico City. 
In December 1907 he left for the Netherlands. 
From February 12, 1908 to August 29, 1913 he was Minister for Foreign Affairs.

Honours 
 1910: Grand Cordon of the Order of Leopold.

References
Biography at the Institute of Netherlands History

1866 births
1955 deaths
20th-century Dutch diplomats
Dutch nobility
Ministers of Foreign Affairs of the Netherlands
Politicians from Groningen (city)
University of Groningen alumni
Independent politicians in the Netherlands
Commanders of the Order of the Netherlands Lion
Knights Grand Cross of the Order of Orange-Nassau
19th-century Dutch diplomats